The Q2 Stadium is a soccer-specific stadium located in the North Burnet section of North Austin, Texas, United States. It is the home of Austin FC, a Major League Soccer (MLS) team that began play in 2021. The stadium hosted its first event on June 16, 2021, an international friendly between the United States women's national team and Nigeria.

Site history
The earliest noted development of the tract of land was in 1956, when the land was christened as a 23.5 acre chemical manufacturing plant. The manufacturing plant produced various chemicals for Reichhold Chemicals, generally peroxides, for the majority of its 29 years as a chemical plant. The facility was closed following a series of on-site safety incidents in December, 1985, which made it economically infeasible to operate.

The land was annexed into the Austin city limits on July 19, 1973.

Reichhold's parent company, DIC Corporation, sold the land to the City of Austin in 1995 for $1.4 million, with the city planning on using it as the Austin Water North Service Center. However, during construction of the facility in 2003, an explosion occurred, with workers finding illegally stored chemical waste on the site. Remediation was undertaken, stripping the site down to bedrock. The city sued DIC, and received $3.6 million.

When Precourt Sports Ventures, operator of Columbus Crew SC, announced they were intending to move the team to Austin, city staff identified eight potential sites for a permanent stadium. 10414 McKalla Place was identified as one of those eight sites, and following some public debate, became the prime candidate following the Austin City Council meeting on March 22, 2018. After several sessions, the Austin City Council granted the City Manager the authority to negotiate and execute a lease with the 7-4 vote during a special session on August 15, 2018. The City announced that the lease had been completed and signed on December 19, 2018.

The 20-year lease of the site includes yearly rent of $550,000 beginning in year six, with an additional $3.6 million being given to Capital Metro for transit. The stadium would be fully financed and built with private money, though stadium ownership would be held by the city itself. The club has the ability to extend the lease up to three times, with each extension being ten years.

Construction

The approximately 20,500 seat stadium is expected to cost $260 million, with team operator Precourt Sports Ventures privately financing the construction. Other elements for the 24-acre site and surroundings include green space, potential housing, and mixed-use retail.

In March 2019, Precourt Sports named Austin Commercial as the construction manager and Gensler as the lead architect for the stadium, and announced that groundbreaking will take place in September 2019.

Re-zoning the site to stadium requirements passed Austin City Council unanimously on June 6, 2019.

On August 19, 2019, a site plan for the Austin FC stadium in North Austin was approved by the city of Austin, Texas.

In January 2021, Austin FC entered a naming rights partnership with Q2 Holdings, a local online banking provider, resulting in the stadium formally being named Q2 Stadium on January 25, 2021.

Public transportation 

Q2 Stadium sits alongside Capital Metro's Red Line commuter rail service. The closest existing station on the Red Line is Kramer station, about a  walk from the stadium. This would provide a much shorter and more direct walking route from rail services to the stadium without having to cross any roads.

Bus connections to the stadium include MetroRapid route 803 and MetroBus routes 3, 383, 392, and 466.

Events
The stadium opened on June 16, 2021, hosting an international women's friendly between the United States and Nigeria. Christen Press scored the first ever goal in the stadium.

Austin FC played their first ever match at the stadium on June 19, 2021, against the San Jose Earthquakes. The match ended with a 0–0 draw in front of a sellout crowd of 20,738. On July 1, 2021, Jon Gallagher scored the first ever competitive goal in Q2 Stadium history, during the 27th minute of Austin FC's 3rd ever regular MLS season home match versus Portland Timbers, eventually finishing as a 4–1 win to Austin FC.

On July 29, 2021, USA beat Qatar in the Gold Cup Semifinals on a Gyasi Zardes goal in the 86th minute, and Q2 hosted its first World Cup qualifying match that October, a 2-0 win against Jamaica. Q2 hosted its first Nations League match on June 10, 2022, a 5-0 win against Grenada. FC Dallas striker Jesús Ferreira scored 4 goals for the Americans in the match, the first ever hat-trick in Q2 Stadium.

International Soccer

References

External links

 

Soccer venues in Texas
Sports venues in Austin, Texas
Major League Soccer stadiums
Gensler buildings
CONCACAF Gold Cup stadiums
Sports venues completed in 2021
2021 establishments in Texas